Ludan, also known as Ludain or Luden, was a Scottish pilgrim to Jerusalem. On his return he died at Scherkirchen, near the city of Strasbourg, France, at which time the bells of a local church began to ring.

Life
The son of Hildebod, a Scottish duke, he employed all his fortune after the death of his father to pity and built, among other things, a hospital for foreigners, the sick and the infirm. He then made a pilgrimage to Jerusalem and returned to Alsace. He died of cold is 1 under a tree Nordhouse the 12 February 1202. It is said that the following words were found in his wallet: "I am the son of the noble Hildebod, Duke of Scotland, and I made myself a pilgrim for the love of God. His body was recovered by the village of Hipsheim where he was buried in the church of Scheerkirche. His tomb was destroyed during the Swedish war.

According to the hagiographic Dictionary of Saints published by the Benedictines of St. Augustine Abbey of Ramsgate (GB) and in accordance with the Roman Calendar, promulgated in 1969:
Saint Ludan, of his real name Loudain, died around 1202. The saint of this name who is venerated at Scherkirchen 2, Bas-Rhin, would be from Scotland or Ireland. Returning from a pilgrimage to the Holy Land, he would have died in France 3, celebrated on 12 February.

References

Medieval Scottish saints
13th-century Christian saints
1202 deaths
Year of birth unknown
13th-century Scottish people